Hobart T. Taylor Jr. (December 17, 1920 – April 2, 1981) was an American attorney and civil servant who was Special Legal Counsel and the Executive Vice Chairman of the President's Committee on Equal Employment Opportunities, the forerunner to the Equal Employment Opportunity Commission from 1961 to 1965. He was the first non-white person to direct the staff of a presidential commission. He is credited with coining the phrase "affirmative action". He was appointed Associate Special Counsel to the President in 1964, making him one of the highest-ranking African Americans in the U.S. government. He left the commission and the White House staff in 1965 to become a director of the Export–Import Bank of the United States, serving until 1968.

Early life and early career
Hobart Taylor Jr. was born on December 17, 1920 in Texarkana, Texas, to Hobart T. Taylor Sr. and his wife, Charlotte ( Wallace). His father, Hobart T. Taylor Sr., was a self-made millionaire who made his fortune in the insurance industry, taxicab business, and real estate. He was a close associate of Lyndon B. Johnson, a Democratic Party activist, and civil rights activist who financed the lawsuit in Grovey v. Townsend, 295 U.S. 45 (1935) (in which all-white primaries in Texas were held to be unconstitutional). About 1930, the family relocated to Houston, Texas, where young Hobart graduated from Yates High School.

He received his bachelor's degree in economics from Prairie View Normal and Industrial College in Prairie View, Texas in 1939. He then enrolled at Howard University in Washington, D.C., where he received his master's degree in economics in 1941. He then attended the University of Michigan Law School, where he received his J.D. and LLB degrees in 1943. He edited the Michigan Law Review while in law school, being the first African American to edit the journal.

Taylor was admitted to the State Bar of Michigan in 1944. He found employment in 1944 as a research clerk for Raymond Wesley Starr, then Chief Justice of the Michigan Supreme Court. He worked for the Chief Justice until 1945 before entering private practice. He then worked as an assisting prosecuting attorney for Wayne County, Michigan, from 1949 to 1950, before becoming corporation counsel for Wayne County in 1950. Taylor left county employment in 1958 to return to private practice. As of February 1961, however, Taylor was the head of the civil division of the Wayne County district attorney's office. Throughout the 1950s, he also performed legal work for several corporations in Texas.

Taylor and his father both made substantial monetary contributions to the 1954 reelection race of Senator Lyndon B. Johnson, and again to Johnson's presidential campaign in 1960.

Federal government service
On April 14, 1961, Taylor was named Special Counsel to the newly-formed President's Committee on Equal Employment Opportunities (PCEEO). Taylor had been slated for the role of Executive Vice Chairman, the top staff job on the committee. But when white conservatives in Texas learned that a liberal African American from Michigan was going to be put in charge of the committee, they raised such objections that Kennedy was forced to name John Feild to the position instead.

He had privately assisted President John F. Kennedy's staff in drafting the executive order that established the committee, and has been credited by many historians for coining the phrase "affirmative action" while serving as special counsel. He was promoted to Executive Vice Chairman of the committee on September 10, 1962. Taylor was the first non-white person to lead the staff of a U.S. presidential committee.

On April 4, 1964, President Johnson appointed Taylor to the position of Associate Special Counsel to the President. The appointment made Taylor one of the highest-ranking African Americans in the U.S. government. Taylor continued to serve as Executive Vice Chairman of PCEEO, and played an important role in helping to implement the Civil Rights Act of 1964.

Taylor resigned his PCEEO and White House positions on August 25, 1965, when President Johnson appointed him a director of the Export-Import Bank. His nomination was approved by the United States Senate on September 2, 1965.

Retirement and death
Taylor resigned his directorship at the Export-Import Bank on January 22, 1968, and returned to private practice of the law. He joined the D.C. law firm of Dawson, Riddell, Taylor, Davis and Holroyd, then left in 1980 to become counsel for Jones, Day, Reavis and Pogue. He also served on the board of directors of a wide range of corporations, including Aetna Life and Casualty Company, Burroughs Corporation, Eastern Air Lines, The Great Atlantic and Pacific Tea Company, Standard Oil of Ohio, Urban National Corporation, and Westinghouse Electric Corporation.

Taylor served for short periods of time in two federal government commissions, the 1977 Commission on Postal Service and the 1979 Commission on Executive Exchange.

He was a member of the Democratic National Committee, a trustee of the NAACP, and vice chairman and trustee of the Wolf Trap Foundation for the Performing Arts.

Hobart Taylor suffered from amyotrophic lateral sclerosis, and he died of the disease on April 2, 1981, while staying at Lyford Cay on the island of New Providence in The Bahamas. He was buried at the Emmanuel Episcopal Church Cemetery in Middleburg, Virginia.

Personal life
Taylor married Lynette Dobbins of Birmingham, Alabama, on January 26, 1950. Lyndon Johnson became the first President of the United States to dance with an African American woman at an inaugural ball when he danced with Lynette Dobbins Taylor on January 20, 1965. The couple had two children, Hobart III and Albert. The Taylors divorced in 1975.

Taylor married Carol Angermeir in 1978. He became stepfather to her children, Edward Rader and Teresa Warner.

References
Notes

Citations

Bibliography

External links
Hobart Taylor Jr. papers at the University of Michigan

1920 births
1981 deaths
People from Texarkana, Texas
Prairie View A&M University alumni
Howard University alumni
University of Michigan Law School alumni
People from Washington, D.C.
Lyndon B. Johnson administration personnel
Kennedy administration personnel
Neurological disease deaths in the Bahamas
Deaths from motor neuron disease
African-American lawyers
20th-century American lawyers
Michigan lawyers